Geograpsus severnsi is an extinct species of land crab from Hawaii. It died out shortly after humans colonized the Hawaiian Islands. It is the first known documented crab to become extinct after the ice age.

Distribution
Specimens of G. severnsi have been recovered from several of the Hawaiian high islands, including Hawaii, Maui, Oahu and Kauai. Its range appears to have overlapped with that of the more coastal G. crinipes, a species which is widespread across the Indo-Pacific.

Description
Geograpsus severnsi was probably the largest species in the genus. Most of the known specimens are males, but this is thought to reflect behavioral differences between the sexes, rather than an extreme sex ratio in the population. This is also seen in the Ascension Island species Johngarthia lagostoma, where females are likely to die on their reproductive migration. It is therefore likely that G. severnsi had a similar ecology to other land crabs. It would have been an omnivore and a predator, possibly feeding on insects, land snails and bird's eggs.

Systematics
G. severnsi is one of five species in the genus Geograpsus. Its closest relative appears to be G. grayi, a species found from the western Indian Ocean to the Line Islands and Marshall Islands. G. severnsi has been known to Hawaiian zoologists since the mid-1970s, but was only formally described in 2011. The specific epithet severnsi commemorates Mike Severns, the discoverer of the cave which housed most of the remains.

References

Grapsidae
Terrestrial crustaceans
Holocene extinctions
Endemic fauna of Hawaii
Crustaceans described in 2011